Colus gracilis is a species of sea snail, a marine gastropod mollusk in the family Buccinidae, the true whelks and the like.

Description
A smooth form with flatter whorls, 40 to 100 mm in length, but a highly variable species that occurs in several morphologically different geographical and bathymetrical forms; these forms may look identical over large areas, then give an impression that several near species are involved.

Distribution
{It lives on sand to mud bottoms, between 50 to 1500 m, from northern Norway to Portugal. A species frequently accidentally fished by fishing trap fishermen from the Channel and the Bay of Biscay, such as those from the port of Conquet in Brittany; this fishing trap fishery is the only one that brings this difficultly accessible species back to land. See Bouchet and Waren 1985. See also European Seashells Vol.1, from Poppe and Goto 1991.}

References

 Thorson G. (1944). The Zoology of East Greenland. Marine Gastropoda Prosobranchiata. Meddelelser om Grønland 121 (13): 1-181
 Howson, C.M.; Picton, B.E. (1997). The species directory of the marine fauna and flora of the British Isles and surrounding seas. Ulster Museum Publication, 276. The Ulster Museum: Belfast, UK. . vi, 508 (+ cd-rom) pp.

External links
 Da Costa, Mendes E. (1778). Historia naturalis testaceorum Britanniæ, or, the British conchology; containing the descriptions and other particulars of natural history of the shells of Great Britain and Ireland: illustrated with figures. In English and French. - Historia naturalis testaceorum Britanniæ, ou, la conchologie Britannique; contenant les descriptions & autres particularités d'histoire naturelle des coquilles de la Grande Bretagne & de l'Irlande: avec figures en taille douce. En anglois & françois., i-xii, 1-254, i-vii, [1, Pl. I-XVII. London. (Millan, White, Emsley & Robson)]
 Kobelt, W. (1876). Beiträge zur arctischen Fauna. Jahrbücher der Deutschen Malakozoologischen Gesellschaft. 3: 61-76, 165-180.
 Jeffreys J.G. (1862-1869). British conchology. Vol. 1: pp. cxiv + 341 [1862. Vol. 2: pp. 479 [1864]. Vol. 3: pp. 394 [1865]. Vol. 4: pp. 487 [1867]. Vol. 5: pp. 259 [1869]. London, van Voorst.]
 Harmer F.W. (1914-1918). The Pliocene Mollusca of Great Britain, being supplementary to S.V. Wood's monograph of the Crag Mollusca. Vol. 1. Monographs of the Palaeontographical Society. 67(330): 1-200, pl. 1-24 (part 1, February 1914); 68(333): 201-302, pl. 25-32 (part 2, July 1915); 70 (337): 303- 461, pl. 33-44 (part 3, February 1918); 71(341): i-xii, 463-483 (part 4, April 1919).
 Locard A. (1896) Mollusques testacés et brachiopodes, pp. 129-242, pl. 5-6, in: Koehler R. (1896) Résultats scientifiques de le campagne du "Caudan" dans le Golfe de Gascogne. Annales de l'Université de Lyon, 26
 Middendorff T. A. von. (1849). Beiträge zur einer Malacozoologica Rossica, II. Aufzählung und Beschreibung der zur Meeresfauna Russlands gehörigen Einschaler. Mémoires de l'Académie Impériale des Sciences de St-Petersbourg, sixième série, Sciences naturelles. 6: 329-516, pl. 1-11
 Bouchet, P.; Warén, A. (1985). Revision of the Northeast Atlantic bathyal and abyssal Neogastropoda excluding Turridae (Mollusca, Gastropoda). Bollettino Malacologico. supplement 1: 121-296
  Serge GOFAS, Ángel A. LUQUE, Joan Daniel OLIVER,José TEMPLADO & Alberto SERRA (2021) - The Mollusca of Galicia Bank (NE Atlantic Ocean); European Journal of Taxonomy 785: 1–114

Buccinidae
Gastropods described in 1778
Taxa named by Emanuel Mendes da Costa